Saffron Brand Consultants is an independent global brand consultancy. It was founded in 2001 by Jacob Benbunan and Wally Olins.

The company has offices in London, Madrid, Vienna, Istanbul and Mumbai, with strategic partners in New York and São Paulo. They claim to have clients all over the world, from San Francisco to London, from Moscow to Hong Kong.

Work
Saffron has advised businesses and institutions all over the world on brand and strategy. Their clients come from a wide variety of sectors, from energy to telecommunications, retail to museums, Silicon Valley giants to European start-ups.

Some notable clients include YouTube, Siemens, Engie, Goldman Sachs, Santander, T-Mobile, Vueling, BBVA, Bankinter, Sodexo, Flying Tiger Copenhagen, Pacha, A1 Telekom Austria, C&A, Fujitsu, Volotea, V Festival, Doha Film Institute, King's College London, The Institute of Cancer Research, Madrid Open and Turkcell, Vueling, Coca Cola, C&A, Fujitsu, Raiffeisen Bank International, LVMH, Iberia, Lloyd's of London, Swiss Re.

Saffron has worked for a number of cities and countries on place brand strategy and identities including Vienna, the world’s most liveable city, and London, Northern Ireland, Turkey, Trinidad & Tobago and Poland. The company also works to define Employee Value Proposition for clients, notably Sodexo, one of the world’s largest employers.

Recent clients of Saffron include London’s Victoria & Albert Museum, Despegar – Latin America’s largest online travel agency, HK Express airline, Collinear, Gulf Air, Repsol and Bittensor.

References

External links
Saffron Brand Consultants
Company Profile Design

Branding companies of the United Kingdom
Marketing companies established in 2001